ABC News is a news-gathering and broadcasting division of the American Broadcasting Company.

ABC News may also refer to:
Subjects affiliated with the American Broadcasting Company:
ABC News Now, a defunct American television channel
ABC News Now (radio network), an American radio service
ABC News Radio, an American radio service
 ABC News (Albanian TV channel)
 ABC News (Australia), a national news service of the Australian Broadcasting Corporation
 ABC News (Australian TV channel), the 24-hour news channel of the Australian ABC
 ABC NewsRadio, the news radio service of the Australian ABC
 ABC (Swedish TV programme), a former Swedish regional news programme from SVT for the Stockholm (AB) and Uppsala (C) Counties
 ABCnews.com.co, a fake news site that spoofed the American ABC News
 News5, a Philippine news service operated by TV5; formerly known as ABC News

See also 
 ABC Television (disambiguation)
 ABC (disambiguation)